George Kofi Daniels (8 March 1950 – 13 August 2005) was a Ghanaian sprinter who competed in the 1972 Summer Olympics.

References

1950 births
2005 deaths
Ghanaian male sprinters
Olympic athletes of Ghana
Athletes (track and field) at the 1972 Summer Olympics
Commonwealth Games silver medallists for Ghana
Athletes (track and field) at the 1970 British Commonwealth Games
Athletes (track and field) at the 1974 British Commonwealth Games
Commonwealth Games medallists in athletics
African Games silver medalists for Ghana
African Games medalists in athletics (track and field)
Athletes (track and field) at the 1973 All-Africa Games
20th-century Ghanaian people
21st-century Ghanaian people
Medallists at the 1970 British Commonwealth Games
Medallists at the 1974 British Commonwealth Games